Alvarado is a Spanish surname. Notable people with the surname include:

Angela Alvarado (born 1964), American actress and director, wife of Robi Rosa
Atilano Cruz Alvarado (born 1901), saint of the Cristero War
Carlos Alvarado Quesada President of Costa Rica (2018-)
Carlos Alvarado-Larroucau (born 1964), writer
Daniel Alvarado (1949–2020), Venezuelan actor
Gonzalo de Alvarado y Contreras, 16th-century Spanish conquistador
Isai Alvarado (born 1985), American professional Super Smash Bros. player
Jorge de Alvarado (died 1540s), y Contreras, conquistador
José Alvarado (baseball) (born 1995), Venezuelan baseball pitcher 
Jose Alvarado (basketball) (born 1998), American professional basketball player
Juan Bautista Alvarado (1809–1882), governor of Alta California (1836–1837, 1838–1842)
Juan Carlos Alvarado (politician), Venezuelan politician
Juan Carlos Alvarado, Christian pop singer
Juan Velasco Alvarado (1910–1977), ruler of Peru
Pedro de Alvarado (died 1541), Spanish conquistador and governor of Guatemala
Pete Alvarado (1920-2003), American animator
Rosana Alvarado
Rudecindo Alvarado (1792–1872), Argentine general
Salvador Alvarado (1880–1924), Mexican politician and soldier 
Trini Alvarado (born 1967), actress
DJ Trevi (born 1990), born Treavor Alvarado, American actor, director, DJ, music producer, and DP

See also
 Alvarado family - conquistadors
 Alvarado wrestling family

Spanish-language surnames